Lady Yehwa of the Haeju Wang clan was the daughter of Wang-Yu who became the 19th wife of Taejo of Goryeo. Her father was initially Bak-Yu (박유), but later changed into "Wang" after Taejo established the new Goryeo dynasty. From this point, Wang-Yu became the founder of Haeju Wang clan (해주 왕씨, 海州王氏).

References

External links
예화부인 on Encykorea .

Year of birth unknown
Year of death unknown
Consorts of Taejo of Goryeo
People from Chuncheon